Events during the year 1189 in Italy.

Events 
 Tancred, Count of Lecce is elected by Norman officials as new King of Sicily instead of the designated heiress Constance and is supported by Matthew d'Ajello and Pope Clement III.

Deaths 
18 November – King William II of Sicily

References
 

Years of the 12th century in Italy
Italy
Italy